Malvern College Qingdao (MCQ) is a British international school in Chengyang District, Qingdao. It is affiliated to Malvern College in the United Kingdom, being its first overseas branch school. Malvern Qingdao opened in September 2012. In 2013 it had 140 students. As of 2015 it has about 300 students.

References

External links
 Malvern College Qingdao
  Malvern College Qingdao
 From Malvern College:
 Malvern College Qingdao
 Information in Chinese

2012 establishments in China
Educational institutions established in 2012
British international schools in China
Education in Qingdao